Shoaib Laghari (born 21 March 1986) is a Pakistani first-class cricketer.

References

External links
 

1986 births
Living people
Pakistani cricketers
Cricketers from Hyderabad, Sindh
Hyderabad (Pakistan) cricketers